Allahakbarries was an amateur cricket team founded by author J. M. Barrie, and was active from 1890 to 1913. The team's name was a portmanteau of Barrie's name and the mistaken belief that 'Allah akbar' meant 'Heaven help us' in Arabic (rather than its true meaning: 'God is great'). Notable figures to have featured for the side included Rudyard Kipling, H. G. Wells, Arthur Conan Doyle, P. G. Wodehouse, G. K. Chesterton, Jerome K. Jerome, A. A. Milne, E. W. Hornung, Henry Justice Ford, A. E. W. Mason, Walter Raleigh, E. V. Lucas, Maurice Hewlett, Owen Seaman, Bernard Partridge, Augustine Birrell, Paul Du Chaillu, Henry Herbert La Thangue, George Cecil Ives, and George Llewelyn Davies, as well as the son of Alfred Tennyson.

Barrie wrote a 40-page book on his team, Allahakbarries C.C., which was published privately in 1890 and in a revised version in 1899. It was reprinted in 1950 with a foreword by Donald Bradman. These rare books are now highly sought by collectors.

Barrie's enthusiasm for the game eclipsed his talent for it; asked to describe his bowling, he replied that after delivering the ball he would go and sit on the turf at mid-off and wait for it to reach the other end which "it sometimes did". The team played for the love of the game, rather than the results it achieved, and Barrie was generous in his praise for his teammates and opposition alike. He praised one teammate's performance by observing that "You scored a good single in the first innings but were not so successful in the second" while he lauded the opposition's effort by pointing out how "You ran up a fine total of 14, and very nearly won". He instructed Bernard Partridge, an illustrator from Punch magazine who was afflicted with a lazy eye, to "Keep your eye on square leg" while bowling, and told square leg, "when Partridge is bowling, keep your eye on him." He forbade his team to practise on an opponent's ground before a match because "this can only give them confidence". The book notes that his most calamitous performance was being clean-bowled by the American actress Mary Anderson in the 1897 Test match against the village of Broadway, in the Cotswolds.

Peter Pan's First XI: The Extraordinary Story of J. M. Barrie's Cricket Team, written by Kevin Telfer, was published in 2011.

References

External links
Peter Pan at play
BBC News, 7 May 2010: 'How Peter Pan's author invented celebrity cricket'

English club cricket teams
1890 establishments in England
1913 disestablishments in England